Keuzenkamp is a surname. Notable people with the surname include:

  (born 1947), South African singer
 Hugo Keuzenkamp (born 1961), Dutch economist